The 2013–14 West Coast Conference men's basketball season began with practices in October 2013 and ended with the 2014 West Coast Conference men's basketball tournament at the Orleans Arena March 6–11, 2014 in Las Vegas. The regular season began in November, with the conference schedule starting at the end of December.

This was the 63rd season for the conference, and the 25th under its current name as "West Coast Conference". The conference began as the California Basketball Association in 1952, became the West Coast Athletic Conference in 1956, and dropped the word "Athletic" in 1989. The conference went through significant changes this season, adding a new member for the second time in three seasons and bringing the WCC to 10 members. Original conference founder, and a fellow faith-based, private school Pacific, rejoined the conference from the Big West.

Pre-season
 Pre-season media day took place on Thursday, October 24 at the Time Warner Cable SportsNet and Time Warner Cable Deportes Studios. Video interviews were hosted on the WCC's streaming video outler, TheW.tv, beginning at 11:30 AM PDT. Jeff Lampe of WCC Live also interviewed each coach and get a preview of their respective season. The regional television schedule announcement, the Preseason All-Conference team, and the pre-season coaches' rankings were some of the additional events that took place.

2013–14 West Coast Men's Basketball Media Poll
Rank, School (first-place votes), Points
1. Gonzaga (8), 80
2. BYU (1), 72
3. St. Mary's (1), 66
4. San Francisco, 51
5. San Diego, 50
6. Loyola Marymount, 44
7. Pacific, 28
8. Santa Clara, 25
9. Portland, 24
10. Pepperdine, 10

2013–14 WCC Men's Preseason All-Conference Team
Player, School, Yr., Pos.
Gary Bell, Gonzaga, Jr., G
Stacy Davis, Pepperdine, So., F
Johnny Dee, San Diego, Jr., G
Cole Dickerson, San Francisco, Sr., F
Cody Doolin, San Francisco, Sr., G
Tyler Haws, BYU, Jr., G
Stephen Holt, Saint Mary's, Sr., G
Anthony Ireland, Loyola Marymount, Sr., G
Kevin Pangos, Gonzaga, Jr., G
Brad Waldow, Saint Mary's, Jr., F

Rankings

Non-Conference games
BYU defeated Texas in the semifinals of the CBE Classic. In the month of January, Texas would go on to defeat 4 consecutive top-25 opponents, giving BYU a win over a Top 25 RPI school.
BYU defeated Stanford as part of the ESPN College Tip-Off. Stanford would finish the year as a Top 50 RPI school, giving BYU a 2nd win over a power conference Top 50 RPI school.

Conference games

Composite Matrix
This table summarizes the head-to-head results between teams in conference play. (x) indicates games remaining this season.

Conference tournament

  March 6–11, 2014– West Coast Conference Basketball Tournament, Orleans Arena, Las Vegas, NV.

Head coaches
Dave Rose, BYU
Mark Few, Gonzaga
Max Good, Loyola Marymount
Ron Verlin, Pacific
Marty Wilson, Pepperdine
Eric Reveno, Portland
Randy Bennett, Saint Mary's
Bill Grier, San Diego
Rex Walters, San Francisco
Kerry Keating, Santa Clara

Post season

NCAA tournament

NIT

CBI

CiT

Highlights and notes
The Highlights and notes will be posted as the season progresses.

Awards and honors

Scholar-Athlete of the Year

WCC Player-of-the-Week

 Nov. 11- Tony Gill, F, Pacific
 Nov. 25 – Kevin Pangos, G, Gonzaga
 Dec. 9  – Thomas van der Mars, C, Portland
 Dec. 23 – Bryce Pressley, G, Portland
 Jan. 6  – Skyler Halford, G, BYU
 Jan. 20 – Sam Dower, Jr., C, Gonzaga
 Feb. 3  – Tyler Haws, G, BYU
 Feb. 17 – Kruize Pinkins, F, San Francisco
 Mar. 3  –
 Nov. 18 – Stacy Davis, F, Pepperdine
 Dec. 2  – Kevin Pangos, G, Gonzaga
 Dec. 16 – Stephen Holt, G, Saint Mary's
 Dec. 30 – Malcolm Brooks, G, Pepperdine
 Jan. 13 – Tyler Haws, G, BYU
 Jan. 27 – Johnny Dee, G, San Diego
 Feb. 10 – Stephen Holt, G, Saint Mary's
 Feb. 24 - Matt Carlino, G, BYU

College Madnesss West Coast Player of the Week

 Nov. 10 - Tony Gill, F, Pacific
 Nov. 24 – Kevin Pangos, G, Gonzaga
 Dec. 8  – T. J. Wallace, G, Pacific
 Dec. 22 – Bryce Pressley, G, Portland
 Jan. 5  – Brendan Lane, F, Pepperdine
 Jan. 19 – Sam Dower, Jr., C, Gonzaga
 Feb. 2  – Tyler Haws, G, BYU (also High-Major Madness Player of the Week)
 Feb. 16 – Kruize Pinkins, F, San Francisco
 Mar. 2  – 
 Nov. 17 – Kyle Collinsworth, G, BYU
 Dec. 1  – Kevin Bailey, G, Portland
 Dec. 15 – Stephen Holt, G, Saint Mary's
 Dec. 29 – Evan Payne, G, Loyola Marymount
 Jan. 12 – Bryce Pressley, G, Portland
 Jan. 26 – Tyler Haws, G, BYU
 Feb. 9 – Beau Levesque, F, Saint Mary's
 Feb. 23 - Matt Carlino, G, BYU

All-Americans

All West Coast Conference teams
The voting body for all conference awards consisted of league coaches.
Player of the Year: Tyler Haws, BYU
Defensive Player of the Year: Brendan Lane, Pepperdine
Newcomer of the Year: Jared Brownridge, Santa Clara
Coach of the Year: Rex Walters, San Francisco

All-Conference

Honorable Mention

All-Freshman

All-Academic

See also
2013-14 NCAA Division I men's basketball season
West Coast Conference men's basketball tournament
2013–14 West Coast Conference women's basketball season
West Coast Conference women's basketball tournament
2014 West Coast Conference women's basketball tournament

References